Bratovo may refer to:
	
 In Bulgaria (written in Cyrillic as Братово):
 Bratovo, Burgas Province - a town in Burgas municipality, Burgas Province
 Bratovo, Targovishte Province - a village in Targovishte municipality, Targovishte Province